Sebe-Brikolo is a department of Haut-Ogooué Province in eastern Gabon. The capital lies at Okondja. It had a population of 16,443 in 2013.

Towns and villages

Lekori, Ossélé, Opoungou, Mbounga, Okila, Ngoma, Ayanabo, Alagna, Odjala etc...

References

Haut-Ogooué Province
Departments of Gabon